During the 2005–06 German football season, FC Schalke 04 competed in the Bundesliga.

Season summary
The 2005-06 season was one of ups and downs for Schalke. The club only dropped two points more compared to the previous season, but this was only good enough to see Schalke finish in 4th. Schalke also exited the Champions League at the group stage, though there was little shame in elimination given that they were placed in the same group as last season's runners-up AC Milan and semi-finalists PSV Eindhoven. Schalke compensated with a great run to the UEFA Cup semi-final, with eventual champions Sevilla needing extra time to overcome the Germans. Less flattering was Schalke's domestic cup form, with the club thrashed by eventual finalists Frankfurt 6-0 in the second round. This humiliation, along with the mediocre league form, saw coach Ralf Rangnick sacked in December, with Mirko Slomka appointed as his replacement in early January.

First-team squad
Squad at end of season

Left club during season

Competitions

Bundesliga

League table

DFB-Pokal

First round

Second round

UEFA Champions League

Group stage

UEFA Cup

Knockout phase

Round of 32

Round of 16

Quarter-finals

Semi-finals

References

Notes

FC Schalke 04 seasons
FC Schalke 04